The Switzerland women's national under-16 basketball team is a national basketball team of Switzerland, administered by the Swiss Basketball.
It represents the country in international under-16 women's basketball competitions.

FIBA U16 Women's European Championship participations

See also
Switzerland women's national basketball team
Switzerland women's national under-18 basketball team
Switzerland men's national under-16 basketball team

References

External links
Archived records of Switzerland team participations

Basketball
Women's national under-16 basketball teams